Raymond Harold Harris (March 5, 1898 – July 25, 1964), nicknamed "Mo", was an American Negro league second baseman between 1918 and 1931.

Early life and career
A native of Allegheny City, Pennsylvania, Harris attended Allegheny High School. He made his Negro leagues debut with the Homestead Grays in 1918. Harris played several seasons with the Grays through 1929, then finished his playing career with the Pittsburgh Crawfords in 1931. After his playing days, he went on to enjoy a long umpiring career in the Negro National League. Harris died in Pittsburgh, Pennsylvania in 1964 at age 66.

References

Further reading
 Courier staff (July 7, 1923). "Off the Bat". The Pittsburgh Courier. p. 7
 Courier staff (August 22, 1925) "This Pair Has Speed and Brains". The Pittsburgh Courier. p. 6
 'Monitor' (September 7, 1929). "How Come?". The Pittsburgh Courier. p. 16
 Courier staff (March 14, 1931). "'Mo' Harris to Manage Black Hawks". The Pittsburgh Courier. p. 15

External links
 and Baseball-Reference Black Baseball stats and Seamheads

1898 births
1964 deaths
Homestead Grays players
Pittsburgh Crawfords players
20th-century African-American sportspeople
Baseball infielders